Harvest Time is the debut album from Finnish progressive rock band Elonkorjuu, originally released in 1972. It was re-issued as a CD formation in 2002. The album is inspired by groups like Cream and Free with more progressive style.

The original pressing of Harvest Time is considered the most expensive Finnish vinyl album with a price up to €1,500.

Track listing 
Side one
 "Unfeeling" – 3:23
 "Swords" – 4:03
 "Captain" – 3:42
 "Praise to Our Basement" – 4:44
 "Future" – 3:56
Side two
 "Hey Hunter" – 3:41
 "The Ocean Song" – 3:17
 "Old Man's Dream" – 4:44
 "Me and My Friend" – 4:02
 "A Little Rocket Song" – 4:04

Personnel 
Heikki Lajunen – vocals 
Jukka Syrenius – guitar, vocals
Veli-Pekka Pessi – bass guitar
Eero Rantasila – drums
Ilkka Poijärvi – organ, flute

References 

Elonkorjuu albums
1972 debut albums